Holy Hell is a heavy metal album released in 2005 by Rob Rock. It is his third solo release and is known for being his heaviest and most aggressive album to date. It was produced by Roy Z who is also known for producing solo albums by Rob Halford and Bruce Dickinson. Roy Z is also credited for performing some of the guitar and bass parts on the album. Other contributing musicians include guitarist Carl Johan Grimmark of Narnia fame, drummer Bobby Jarzombek who has played in bands such as Riot and Halford, and Edguy and Avantasia mainman Tobias Sammet who duets with Rob Rock on the closing track, "Move On".

"Move On" is an ABBA cover, a song  from their 1977 release, ABBA: The Album.  It was the second ABBA song covered by Rock after recording "Eagle", also off ABBA: The Album, for his solo debut, Rage of Creation.

Track listing
 "Slayer of Souls" (3:32)
 "First Winds of the End of Time" (4:38)
 "Calling Angels" (4:40)
 "Holy Hell" (4:03)
 "Lion of Judah" (5:09)
 "I'm a Warrior" (4:20)
 "I'll Be Waiting for You" (4:49)
 "When Darkness Reigns" (5:48)
 "The Revelation" (4:19)
 "Move On" (5:12)  featuring Tobias Sammet

Bonus Tracks:
 "Ride the Wind" featuring Gus G. Guitar Solo (3:51)
 "Lost in a World" from ROC session (5:21)
 "I'm a Warrior (Alternative Mix)" (4:22)
 "First Winds of the End of Time (Alternative Mix)" (4:45)

Credits
Rob Rock – lead and backing vocals
Tobias Sammet – lead vocals on "Move On"
Liza Shekhter – backing vocals and keyboards on "Move On"
Carl Johan Grimmark – guitars
Roy Z – guitars, bass
The Warlock – guitars
Bob Rossi – guitar solo on "The Revelation"
Rick Renstrom – guitar solo on "Holy Hell"
Bobby Jarzombek – drums
Butch Carlson – drums on "Calling Angels"
Dave Moreno – drums on "Move On"
Andreas Olsson – bass
Mistheria – keyboards

References

2005 albums
Rob Rock albums
AFM Records albums
Albums produced by Roy Z